Neomusotima is a genus of moths of the family Crambidae.

Species
Neomusotima conspurcatalis (Warren, 1896)
Neomusotima fuscolinealis Yoshiyasu, 1985

References

Natural History Museum Lepidoptera genus database

Musotiminae
Crambidae genera